Sicard, Sicardo, Sicardus, Sichard or Sicart is a given name of Germanic origin. It may refer to:
 Sicard of Benevento (died 839), prince of Benevento
 Sichard (died 842), abbot of Farfa
 Sicard of Cremona (1155–1215), bishop of Cremona
 Bernart Sicart de Maruèjols (fl. 1230), troubadour
 Sicart de Figueiras (fl. 1290), Cathar bishop
 Sicard de Lordat (fl. 14th century), architect from the County of Foix

Germanic given names